Europe '72 (Live), released in 1997, is a compilation album of live performances by British jazz-rock group If. It features material from their first four LPs that was recorded live on tour and before studio audiences. The extensive liner notes, giving an exhaustive background on the band, were written by UK music critic Chris Welch.

Track listing 
"Waterfall" – 4:40
"The Light Still Shines" – 5:00
"Sector 17" – 8:06
"Throw Myself to the Wind" – 4:01
"I Couldn't Write and Tell You" – 9:45
"Your City Is Falling" – 5:47
"What Did I Say About the Box, Jack?" – 20:20

Personnel
Dennis Elliott – drums
JW Hodkinson – lead vocals and percussion
John Mealing – keyboards and backing vocals
Dick Morrissey – tenor/soprano saxophones and flute
Dave Quincy – tenor/alto saxophones
Jim Richardson – bass
Terry Smith – guitar

References

If (band) albums
1997 live albums
Repertoire Records live albums